Virginia Cartwright (born 1943) is an American ceramic artist.

Her work is included in the collections of the Los Angeles County Museum of Art, the Nora Eccles Harrison Museum of Art and the Smithsonian American Art Museum.

References

1943 births
20th-century American women artists
21st-century American women artists
Living people
American women ceramists